George True Page (September 22, 1859 – November 4, 1941) was a United States circuit judge of the United States Court of Appeals for the Seventh Circuit.

Education and career

Born in Spring Bay, Illinois, Page attended the University of Illinois at Urbana–Champaign and read law to enter the bar in 1882. He was in private practice in Denver, Colorado from 1882 to 1884 and then in private practice in Peoria, Illinois until 1919.

Federal judicial service

On March 1, 1919, Page was nominated by President Woodrow Wilson to a seat on the United States Court of Appeals for the Seventh Circuit vacated by Judge Christian Cecil Kohlsaat. Page was confirmed by the United States Senate on March 1, 1919, and received his commission the same day. He assumed senior status on October 1, 1930, serving in that capacity until his death on November 4, 1941, in La Jolla, California.

Other service

Page served as Chairman of the Commercial Merchants National Bank and Trust Company from 1930 to 1941.

References

Sources
 

1859 births
1941 deaths
Judges of the United States Court of Appeals for the Seventh Circuit
United States court of appeals judges appointed by Woodrow Wilson
20th-century American judges
United States federal judges admitted to the practice of law by reading law